The Tsezic languages (also called Didoic languages) form one of the seven main branches of Northeast Caucasian language family. It branches into Tsez–Hinukh and Bezhta–Hunzib–Khwarshi, according to research published in 2009. They were formerly classified geographically into East Tsezic (Hinukh, and Bezhta) and West Tsezic (Tsez, Khwarshi, and Hunzib).
The Avar language serves as the literary language for speakers of Tsezic languages.

Internal branching 
Schulze (2009) gives the following family tree for the Tsezic languages:

Tsez–Hinukh
Tsez (15,400)
Hinukh (550)
Bezhta–Hunzib–Khwarshi
Bezhta (6200)
Hunzib (1840)
Khwarshi (1870)

Figures retrieved from Ethnologue.

Kassian and Testelets (2015) do not consider Tsez and Hinukh to form a distinct subgroup.

References

See also 
Languages of the Caucasus

Northeast Caucasian languages